Cychrus chareti is a species of ground beetle in the subfamily of Carabinae that can be found in Sichuan and Yunnan provinces of China. It was described by Deuve in 1994.

References

chareti
Beetles described in 1994
Endemic fauna of China
Beetles of Asia